Symphonic Concert 2002 is a live concert DVD by Japanese music composer Yoshiki Hayashi, released on March 30, 2005. The concert took place on December 3 and 4, 2002 at the Tokyo International Forum. This concert is the first solo classical event by Yoshiki. On the concert were performed Yoshiki's classical compositions, performed by the Tokyo City Philharmonic Orchestra, and featuring his solo musical project Violet UK.

Track listing
 "Say Anything"
 "Amethyst"
 "Last Song"
 "Unnamed Song"
 "Forever Love"
 "Longing"
 "Amethyst with Vocal and Piano"
 "Seize the Light"
 "I'll Be Your Love" (featuring Nicole Scherzinger)
 "Screaming Blue"
 "Blind Dance"
 "Anniversary"
 "Endless Rain"
 "Tears"

Personnel

Performers
 Piano & Conductor: Yoshiki
 Vocals: Daughter (from Violet UK), Nicole Scherzinger
 DJ: Colleen Lenihan
 Conductor: Konstantin Dmitrievich Krimets, Ikuro Fujiwara
 Orchestra: Tokyo City Philharmonic Orchestra 

Producers
 Producer: Yoshiki
 Assistant producer: Miyuki Tezuka
 Executive producers: Yoshiki, Hidemi Morita, Masao Nakajima, Masayasu Masuzawa
 Editor: Motoshi Wakabayashi
 Mixing engineer: Joe Chiccarelli
 Recording engineer: Hideaki Okuhara, Dokk Knight
 Musical director: Ikuro Fujiwara
 Stage director: Masaki Sato

References
 

2005 video albums
2005 live albums
Yoshiki (musician) albums
Live video albums